Scott Pendlebury (born 7 January 1988) is a professional Australian rules footballer playing for the Collingwood Football Club in the Australian Football League (AFL). He served as Collingwood captain from 2014 to 2022. Pendlebury won a premiership in 2010, also winning the Norm Smith Medal as best on ground in the grand final replay, and was the AFLCA champion player of the year in 2013. He is a six-time All-Australian and five-time Copeland Trophy winner, and is the Collingwood games record holder with 359 games.

Early life
Originally from Sale in the Gippsland Region of Victoria, Pendlebury began his sporting career playing basketball and accepted a scholarship to the Australian Institute of Sport in Canberra, however, after 3 weeks at the AIS, he decided to quit the Under 18's squad and return to Victoria to pursue professional football with the Gippsland Power in the TAC Cup. Pendlebury's vacated place in the AIS squad was taken by Patty Mills, who went on to win an NBA Championship in 2014 with the San Antonio Spurs. Growing up, Pendlebury supported the Melbourne Football Club.

Pendlebury was selected for the 2005 Under-18 Vic Country team. He played two of the three games and had an average of 17 possessions.

He was selected to play for eventual 2005 TAC Cup premiers Gippsland Power. He played 19 games, kicked 11 goals and averaged 22 possessions a game. Collingwood became aware of Pendlebury after Gippsland Power manager Peter Francis recommended both Pendlebury and his older brother Kristopher. Collingwood drafted Scott Pendlebury with pick five in the 2005 AFL Draft, and Collingwood's number two pick overall, whereas Kris did not play in the AFL but did captain the Collingwood side in the Victorian Football League.

AFL career
Pendlebury began his career wearing number 16 on his guernsey and changed to number 10 at the start of the 2007 season. He is a natural left-footer, rarely wastes a possession, and has excellent vision that has been attributed to his years playing basketball.

2006
Pendlebury's 2006 pre-season was hampered by glandular fever, but he made a successful comeback with Collingwood's VFL affiliate, Williamstown. He made his AFL debut in Round 10 against the Brisbane Lions, and became part of a select group of footballers known for kicking their first goal with their first kick in league football. He played eight more games in the 2006 season.

2007
Pendlebury switched to the number 10 guernsey previously worn by Blake Caracella, and gave the number 16 guernsey to newcomer Nathan Brown. Following his nine games in 2006, Pendlebury broke into the Collingwood midfield on a regular basis, averaging 18 disposals a game before he was nominated for the NAB Rising Star in Round 4. He collected a season-high 26 possessions in the 2007 Semi-Final against the West Coast Eagles in Perth, and kicked a crucial goal during extra time.

Throughout the 2007 season, he was compared with Geelong rookie midfielder Joel Selwood. Both were close favourites for the 2007 NAB Rising Star with Selwood eventually winning by seven votes.

Pendlebury also placed second in the 2007 Copeland Trophy behind Travis Cloke.

2008
Pendlebury was voted into Collingwood's five-man leadership group as deputy vice-captain preceding the 2008 season.

Highlights of Pendlebury's season included 33 disposals against Essendon on ANZAC Day and placing a close second behind Paul Medhurst for the Anzac Day medal.

On 9 May 2008, Pendlebury was selected in the Victorian Squad for the AFL Hall of Fame Tribute Match, with teammates Josh Fraser and Heath Shaw. Despite playing only half of the match, he collected 19 disposals with a 79% efficiency rating.

Pendlebury was an important factor in Collingwood's 86-point victory over reigning premiers Geelong.

Pendlebury played his 50th game on 9 August 2008 against St Kilda in Round 19. He finished third in Collingwood's 2008 Best and Fairest count.

2009

Pendlebury became more prominent in 2009. He collected a career high 39 disposals against Melbourne Football Club on the Queens Birthday and won the Women's Round medal. He had a career high 22 kicks against the West Coast Eagles and another career high 20 handballs against the Richmond Football Club. Despite missing a few games due to injuries, he was still shortlisted for selection as an All-Australian. He had an average of 26 disposals a game (13 kicks and 13 handballs)and averaged 2 goals per 5 games. His season ended with a cracked fibula bone injury in the Qualifying final.

Pendlebury polled 13 votes in the 2009 Brownlow Medal, the top ranked Collingwood player.

2010
In 2010 Pendlebury won a spot in the All-Australian team and won the ANZAC Medal. He polled 21 votes in the 2010 Brownlow Medal, to finish in fourth position. He won the 2010 Norm Smith medal when Collingwood won the premiership.

2011
Three weeks later, against , he was controversially denied a goal from a free kick that would have won Collingwood the game. Ultimately, the Magpies lost by three points.

He capped off a brilliant year, winning the Copeland Trophy for the best and fairest player at Collingwood, and the Bob Rose Trophy for being the best Collingwood player throughout the finals.

In the Brownlow he polled 24 votes to finish equal third behind winner Dane Swan, Sam Mitchell (disqualified) and Nick Dal Santo.

2012
Pendlebury finished the season with 15 brownlow votes, down on his 24 from the previous year and helped the Magpies to a Preliminary Final, where they eventually lost to the Sydney Swans. He finished second in the Copeland Trophy to winner Dayne Beams and in front of three-time champion Dane Swan. He was also included in the All Australian for the 3rd year running alongside teammates Swan and Dayne Beams.

2013

Pendlebury improved on his 2012 season, having arguably his best and most consistent season to date. Already touted as future captain of the Collingwood Football Club, Pendlebury helped lead the club brilliantly in 2013 and although Collingwood lost the Elimination final loss to Port Adelaide, Pendlebury won his second Copeland Trophy beating former champion Dane Swan. He also had 21 votes in the Brownlow, only losing out to teammate Dane Swan for the highest votes for the Magpies. Pendlebury once again was included in the All Australian Squad being named on the wing. This was his fourth consecutive inclusion in the team.

2014
On 29 January, Pendlebury was appointed as captain replacing Nick Maxwell. Pendlebury has thrived as captain having one of his best seasons.

At the end of the season, Pendlebury was selected for the fifth consecutive time as part of the All Australian team and was awarded the Lou Richards Medal. He also won his third Copeland Trophy, the Magpie Army Player of the Year award and the Gavin Brown Award.

2015
During the 2015 Copeland Trophy event, Eddie McGuire announced that Pendlebury had re-signed with Collingwood until the end of 2020. Pendlebury said at event "The direction the club is taking really excites me. We have a solid group of young players who have got a taste of senior footy and we have the right program and people in place to take this group to the next level. I’m proud to captain this club and want to be part of what the future holds." The same night, he won his third consecutive Copeland Trophy and fourth overall.

2016
Pendlebury battled injury early in the season as well as filled in as a half-back instead of his regular role in the midfield, and despite this maintained his consistency. His professionalism and inspiration caused his peers to vote for him as the winner of the Gavin Brown Award for demonstrating the team values throughout the season. He was further rewarded with his fourth consecutive Copeland Trophy and fifth overall.

2017
Pendlebury had a consistent 2017 season until he sustained a broken finger in Round 17 against the Gold Coast Suns. He had successful surgery on the finger, and was hopeful to return the next week, but his return was delayed for a month and it was said to be unlikely that he would play again until Round 22 or 23. However, did not return again for the season. In the 2017 season, he averaged a career high tackles per game (6.4).

2020
In round 18 of the 2020 season, he broke the Collingwood record for most VFL/AFL games played, as well as most games as captain.

Personal life
Pendlebury was born and raised in Sale, Victoria. He attended Catholic College Sale. He played alongside former Collingwood players Dale Thomas, Tyson Goldsack and Brent Macaffer at the Gippsland Power before all getting drafted to Collingwood.  He has two brothers who have both played football in the Victorian Football League (VFL).  Older brother Kris has won the Joseph Wren Memorial Trophy and captained the Collingwood VFL Football Club and younger brother Ryan has played for three teams in the VFL. Scott Pendlebury married his long-term girlfriend, Alex Pendlebury (née Davis), in 2016. The couple's first son was born in 2017, and welcomed a daughter in November 2019.

Statistics
Updated to the end of round 1, 2023.

|-
| 2006 ||  || 16
| 9 || 4 || 0 || 67 || 51 || 118 || 46 || 25 || 0.4 || 0.0 || 7.4 || 5.7 || 13.1 || 5.1 || 2.8 || 0
|- 
| 2007 ||  || 10
| 23 || 20 || 8 || 238 || 197 || 435 || 124 || 75 || 0.9 || 0.3 || 10.3 || 8.6 || 18.9 || 5.4 || 3.3 || 1
|-
| 2008 ||  || 10
| 23 || 11 || 10 || 283 || 235 || 518 || 113 || 77 || 0.5 || 0.4 || 12.3 || 10.2 || 22.5 || 4.9 || 3.3 || 7
|- 
| 2009 ||  || 10
| 21 || 8 || 4 || 271 || 271 || 542 || 105 || 69 || 0.4 || 0.2 || 12.9 || 12.9 || 25.8 || 5.0 || 3.3 || 13
|-
| bgcolor=F0E68C | 2010# ||  || 10
| 26 || 17 || 13 || 339 || 352 || 691 || 116 || 144 || 0.7 || 0.5 || 13.0 || 13.5 || 26.6 || 4.5 || 5.5 || 21
|- 
| 2011 ||  || 10
| 25 || 24 || 12 || 385 || 357 || 742 || 106 || 150 || 1.0 || 0.5 || 15.4 || 14.3 || 29.7 || 4.2 || 6.0 || 24
|-
| 2012 ||  || 10
| 21 || 11 || 8 || 316 || 303 || 619 || 82 || 115 || 0.5 || 0.4 || 15.0 || 14.4 || 29.5 || 3.9 || 5.5 || 15
|- 
| 2013 ||  || 10
| 23 || 18 || 9 || 329 || 359 || 688 || 88 || 119 || 0.8 || 0.4 || 14.3 || 15.6 || 29.9 || 3.8 || 5.2 || 21
|-
| 2014 ||  || 10
| 21 || 13 || 10 || 292 || 304 || 596 || 75 || 116 || 0.6 || 0.5 || 13.9 || 14.5 || 28.4 || 3.6 || 5.5 || 16
|- 
| 2015 ||  || 10
| 22 || 15 || 8 || 321 || 314 || 635 || 97 || 112 || 0.7 || 0.4 || 14.6 || 14.3 || 28.9 || 4.4 || 5.1 || 15
|-
| 2016 ||  || 10
| 22 || 11 || 7 || 289 || 341 || 630 || 78 || 123 || 0.5 || 0.3 || 13.1 || 15.5 || 28.6 || 3.5 || 5.6 || 17
|- 
| 2017 ||  || 10
| 16 || 5 || 7 || 217 || 233 || 450 || 58 || 103 || 0.3 || 0.4 || 13.6 || 14.6 || 28.1 || 3.6 || 6.4 || 15
|-
| 2018 ||  || 10
| 25 || 9 || 5 || 294 || 376 || 670 || 60 || 147 || 0.4 || 0.2 || 11.8 || 15.0 || 26.8 || 2.4 || 5.9 || 15
|- 
| 2019 ||  || 10
| 24 || 12 || 8 || 345 || 310 || 655 || 105 || 112 || 0.5 || 0.3 || 14.4 || 12.9 || 27.3 || 4.4 || 4.7 || 14
|-
| 2020 ||  || 10
| 15 || 1 || 2 || 175 || 179 || 354 || 38 || 45 || 0.1 || 0.1 || 11.7 || 11.9 || 23.6 || 2.5 || 3.0 || 13
|- 
| 2021 ||  || 10
| 18 || 4 || 4 || 197 || 220 || 417 || 67 || 69 || 0.2 || 0.2 || 10.9 || 12.2 || 23.2 || 3.7 || 3.8 || 3
|-
| 2022 ||  || 10
| 24 || 2 || 1 || 274 || 281 || 555 || 74 || 112 || 0.1 || 0.0 || 11.4 || 11.7 || 23.1 || 3.1 || 4.7 || 2
|-
| 2023 ||  || 10
| 1 || 1 || 0 || 13 || 14 || 27 || 4 || 8 || 1.0 || 0.0 || 13.0 || 14.0 || 27.0 || 4.0 || 8.0 || 
|- class=sortbottom
! colspan=3 | Career
! 359 !! 186 !! 116 !! 4645 !! 4697 !! 9342 !! 1436 !! 1721 !! 0.5 !! 0.3 !! 12.9 !! 13.1 !! 26.0 !! 4.0 !! 4.8 !! 215
|}

Notes

Honours and achievements
Team
 AFL premiership player: 2010
 McClelland Trophy: 2010, 2011

Individual
 Collingwood captain: 2014–2022
 Norm Smith Medal: 2010
 AFLCA champion player of the year: 2013
 Collingwood games record holder
 6× All-Australian team: 2010, 2011, 2012, 2013, 2014, 2019
 5× Copeland Trophy: 2011, 2013, 2014, 2015, 2016
 2× AFLPA best captain: 2020, 2022
 AFLCA best young player: 2007
 3× Anzac Medal: 2010, 2011, 2019
 Lou Richards Medal: 2014
 AFL Rising Star nominee: 2007

References

External links

 
 
 

1988 births
Living people
Collingwood Football Club players
Collingwood Football Club Premiership players
Norm Smith Medal winners
All-Australians (AFL)
Australian rules footballers from Victoria (Australia)
Gippsland Power players
Sale Football Club players
Copeland Trophy winners
People from Sale, Victoria
Australia international rules football team players
One-time VFL/AFL Premiership players